The Naval Chronicle was a British periodical published monthly between January, 1799 and December, 1818 (Huntington).  It contained information about the Royal Navy of the United Kingdom, including biographies, histories, news, and essays on nautical subjects, as well as poems and ballads on a variety of related topics (Jeffery).

The founders were James Stanier Clarke and John McArthur, and the editorial staff included Stephen Jones and his brother John Jones (father of John Winter Jones). Contributors included Francis Gibson, and Charles Vinicombe Penrose under initials as pseudonyms. Nicholas Pocock provided a long series of illustrations.

Notes

References
Huntington Library Catalog
Jeffery, Walter James.  Index to The Naval Chronicle 1798-1818.  Publisher: S.N., 1933.

External links 
 Naval Chronicle Vol. 1-38
Vol. 1 January - June, 1799
Vol. 2, July - December, 1800
Vol. 3, January - July
Vol. 4
Vol. 5
Vol. 6, June - December
Vol. 7, January - June
  Naval Chronicle. Vol. 8. July - December 1802
Vol. 9
 Naval Chronicle. Vol. 10. July - December ?
Vol. 11, January - June
Vol. 12, July - December
Vol. 13, January - June
Vol. 14, 1805
Naval Chronicle. Vol. 15, January - June, 1806
Vol. 16, July - December
Vol. 17, January - June
Vol. 19
Vol. 20
 Naval Chronicle. Vol. 21. January - June 1809
Vol. 22, July - December
Vol. 23, January - June
Vol. 24. July - December 1810
Vol. 25. January 1811 - July 1811
 Naval Chronicle. Vol. 28. July - December 1812
Naval Chronicle. Vol. 30. July - December 1813
Naval Chronicle. Vol. 31. January - June 1814
Naval Chronicle. Vol. 33. January - June 1815
Vol. 18
Vol. 27
Vol. 30, July - December
Vol. 32
 Vol. 33
Vol. 34
Vol. 35
Vol. 36
Vol. 37
 Vol. 38, July - December
1799 establishments in Great Britain
1818 disestablishments in the United Kingdom
Publications established in 1799
Publications disestablished in 1818
Royal Navy